Midge Hall is a small village on the outskirts of Leyland in the borough of South Ribble, Lancashire, England.

Notable features include the Midge Hall pub, a mill which produces animal feed and a test track for cars and wagons from the Leyland Trucks factory.

There is a disused railway station which is on the Ormskirk Branch Line.

Geography
Midge Hall lies to the south of New Longton and Whitestake and to the north of Leyland and to the east of Much Hoole, with parts of Leyland on its west also. It has a Methodist church, a small pub and a shop that sells bird shib seed.

External links

Villages in Lancashire
Geography of South Ribble
Leyland, Lancashire